Sein Hlaing (10 November 1918 – 7 May 2010) was a Burmese football player and coach, regarded as being the most successful coach in the history of the national team. Sein Hlaing was awarded FIFA Order of Merit in 2004 in recognition of his achievements as a coach.

Biography
Sein Hlaing was born in Tamwe township in Yangon to Daw Su and U Yeit. He attended Myoma National High School. He began playing football at a young age and appeared for the Seven Stars club while still at high school in 1938. Later in 1940, he played for the Friends Union club in Burma's top level of club football as well as the Burma national team as a right midfielder.

After his playing career ended, he took up his first coaching post with the Criminal Investigation Department club in 1952. After serving as coach with this club for ten years, he was appointed coach of the Burma national youth team in 1962. During his tenure as coach, the youth team enjoyed success - winning the Asian Under 20 tournament twice outright, and four more times shared with other teams.

From 1964, he was also coach of the full national team. He coached the national team to victory in the Asian Football Championships in 1966 and 1970 and in the Southeast Asian Games tournaments in 1967, 1969, 1971 and 1973. Burma shared the title with Thailand in 1965. This is the most successful period in Burmese football history.

He coached the team that qualified for, and played in the 1972 Olympic Games where, despite being eliminated in the first round, the Burmese team won the Fair Play award. He continued to coach the national team until retiring in 1979.

In 2004, he was awarded the Centennial Order of Merit by FIFA in recognition of his achievements as a coach.

Death
Sein Hlaing died of complications from diabetes on 7 May 2010 at his home at 42nd St, Botataung Township in Yangon.

Achievements
The following is a list of championships achieved under his leadership.
 Asian Games: 1966, 1970 (co-champion with South Korea)
 SEA Games: 1965 (with Thailand), 1967, 1969, 1971, 1973
 Merdeka Cup: 1964, 1967 (with South Korea), 1971
 AFC U-19 Championship: 1963 (with S Korea), 1964 (with Israel), 1966 (with Israel), 1968, 1969 (with Thailand), 1970

References

1918 births
2010 deaths
Burmese footballers
Myanmar international footballers
Burmese football managers
Myanmar national football team managers
Deaths from diabetes
Sportspeople from Yangon
Association football midfielders